The Kolu kõrts (Estonian for Inn of Kolu) is a relocated authentic inn originally built in the Estonian vernacular style in the village of Kolu, Harjumaa in 1840 and currently exhibited and operated as a part of the Estonian Open Air Museum.

The building was relocated to the museum in 1968 and reconstructed in 1969–1973. Since 1993, a restaurant operates inside the building. The restaurant serves traditional Estonian cuisine.

This inn is of a relatively small size, with only one stable room.

References

Sources 
 Exposition list at the Estonian Open Air Museum's website

External links 
 Kolu kõrts, Estonian Open Air Museum

Hotel buildings completed in 1840
Buildings and structures in Tallinn